Sibynophis is a genus of nonvenomous colubrid snakes, commonly called many-toothed snakes, which together with Scaphiodontophis make up the subfamily Sibynophiinae.

Species
The following nine species are recognized.

 Sibynophis bistrigatus (Günther, 1868) – Günther's many-toothed snake
 Sibynophis bivittatus (Boulenger, 1894) – white-striped snake
 Sibynophis chinensis (Günther, 1889) – Chinese many-toothed snake
 Sibynophis collaris (Gray, 1853) – common many-toothed snake
 Sibynophis geminatus (H. Boie, 1826) – Boie's many-toothed snake
 Sibynophis melanocephalus (Gray, 1835) – black-headed collared snake, Malayan many-toothed snake
 Sibynophis sagittarius (Cantor, 1839) – Cantor's black-headed snake
 Sibynophis subpunctatus (A.M.C. Duméril, Bibron & A. Duméril, 1854) – Duméril's black-headed snake, Jerdon's many-toothed snake
 Sibynophis triangularis Taylor, 1965 – triangle many-tooth snake, triangulate collared snake

References

Sibynophis
Snake genera
Taxa named by Leopold Fitzinger